Code Name Melville (original French title: Sous le nom de Melville) is a feature length documentary film about Jean-Pierre Melville, directed by Olivier Bohler and produced by Raphaël Millet for Nocturnes Productions in 2008. Its world premiere took place in November 2008 at the Golden Horse Film Festival in Taipei. It has been shown on French channel CinéCinéma Classic in March–April 2010, and on Belgian channel La Deux (RTBF) in May 2010. It is the first feature documentary about Jean-Pierre Melville since he died in 1973.

Synopsis 

Jean-Pierre Melville, born Jean-Pierre Grumbach, was of Alsatian Jewish descent. Having to flee Nazi-occupied France during World War II, he joined the French Resistance and took the pseudonym Melville, in tribute to American novelist Herman Melville. He subsequently retained his war name as his stage name, once the war was over. This personal experience of the war and in particular of resistance fighting impacted Melville's formative year and has an influence which can be seen in his films.

Production 

Code Name Melville is a co-production between Nocturnes Productions and the Institut national de l'audiovisuel (INA, the French National Institute for Audiovisual).

It has been funded by the National Center of Cinematography and the moving image, the Regional Fund of Franche-Comté and the Regional Fund of Provence-Alpes-Côte d'Azur, with the support of the French Ministry of Defence, Ciné Cinéma,  RTBF and StudioCanal.

Cast 

 Michel Dreyfus-Schmidt
 Leo Fortel
 Pierre Grasset
 Laurent Grousset
 Rémy Grumbach
 Masahiro Kobayashi
 André S. Labarthe
 Philippe Labro
 Jean-Pierre Melville (archival footage)
 Jean-Jacques Nataf
 Rui Nogueira
 Volker Schlöndorff
 Bertrand Tavernier
 Johnnie To

Festival screenings 

 Golden Horse Film Festival, Taipei, November 2008.
 Torino Film Festival, November 2008.
 Festival International de Programmes Audiovisuels (FIPA), Biarritz, 24 January 2009 (in competition for the Mitrani Award).
 Festival international du film policier de Beaune, 9 April 2009.
 Sotto le Stelle del Cinema, Bologne, 27 July 2009.
 Cambridge Film Festival, 19 & 25 September 2009.
 CineCity - Brighton Film Festival, 24 November 2009.
 Documentary Month in Franche-Comté, 2009.
 Amiens International Film Festival, 19 novembre 2009.
 Tokyo's Franco-Japanese Institute, in conjunction with Tokyo FilmEx, 12 December 2009.
 French Cultural Center in Beijing, 21 December 2009.
 Angers Premiers Plans Festival, January 2010.
 Screenings as part of the Melville retrospective of the 26th French Film Festival in Singapore on 04 & 9 October 2010.
 Screening at LASALLE College of the Arts, Singapore, 8 October 2010.
 Screening at TischAsia (New York University Tisch School of the Arts, Asia), Singapore, 8 October 2010.
 Screening at the Cinémathèque Française (French Cinematheque), Paris, 10 November 2010.
 Screening at the Pera Museum, Istanbul, Turkey, on 25-26–27 February 2011.

References

External links 
 
 Extract of the original French version of Sous le nom de Melville on the official website of Centre régional de documentation pédagogique de Franche-Comté
 Film-documentaire.fr

2008 films
2008 documentary films
Documentary films about film directors and producers
Documentary films about World War II
French documentary films
Films about the French Resistance
2000s French films